"The Funeral" is a song by the American rock band Band of Horses, taken from their debut studio album, Everything All the Time (2006). The alternative rock song was written by the band members. The song was released as the debut single from the band and lead single from the album. A live version of the song appeared earlier on the band's self-titled EP, under the original name "Billion Day Funeral".

In August 2009, Pitchfork Media named "The Funeral" the 67th-greatest song of the 2000s.

Music video
The video for "The Funeral" was directed by Matt Lenski with additional footage by Willy Lenski. The video tells the story of a man whose dog has died. Saddened by his loss, the man drowns his sorrows in alcohol. He then drives under the influence and the end of the video suggests he crashes head-on into a delivery truck.  The video shows a sign for the Galway Bay Bar in Chicago and the cars in the video are all 1970s models.

Track listing
 "The Funeral" - 5:21 (plays at 33 RPM)
 "The End's Not Near" - 3:45 (plays at 45 RPM)

Personnel
Ben Bridwell - Vocals, guitar
Mat Brooke - Guitar
Chris Early - Bass guitar
Tim Meinig / Sera Cahoone - Drums

Appearances in other media

Film
 Assassination of a High School President
 Boot Camp
 Fully Flared
 Love the Beast (Trailer)
 The Stepfather
 127 Hours (Trailer)
 The Collector (Trailer)
Teenage Dirtbag (Trailer)
Battleship
Love and Honor
In the Name Of
Let's Be Cops
Megan Leavey

TV
 Criminal Minds (Season 2, episode 15: "Revelations")
 FlashForward (Season 1, episode 22: "Future Shock")
 Gossip Girl (Season 3, episode 22: "Last Tango, Then Paris" - Sung by Serena Ryder)
 Kyle XY (Season 2, episode 9: "Ghost In The Machine")
 Mercy (Season 1, episode 16 : "I'm Fine")
 My Life as Liz (Season 1, episode 4: "Liz's Got Talent (Part 2)" - Sung by Liz Lee)
 Numb3rs (Season 4, episode 11: "Breaking Point")
 One Tree Hill (Season 4, episode 7: "All These Things That I've Done")
 Standoff (Season 1, episode 12: "No Strings")
 How I Met Your Mother (Season 8, Episode 1: "Farhampton")
 The Night Shift (Season 1, Episode 2: "Second Chances")
 Stumptown (Season 1, Episode 15: "At All Costs: The Conrad Costas Chronicles")
 Tear Along the Dotted Line (Episode 6)
 La casa de papel (season 5, episode 9)
 Irreverent (Season 1, Episode 3: "Episode 3")
 Tear Along the Dotted Line (Episode 6)
 The Best Years'' (Season 1, Episode 13: "Mommy Dearest")

Other
 Skate (2007 video game)
 Ford Edge (2008 television commercial)
 Danny MacAskill (YouTube video of bike trials stunts)
 Rock Band Network (Downloadable content)
 Madden NFL 18 (2017 video game)

Songs that sample "The Funeral"
 "The Prayer" by Kid Cudi
 "Comin' Up" by The Grouch & Eligh

References

External links
Music Video for The Funeral on YouTube

2007 singles
Band of Horses songs
Sub Pop singles
2005 songs
Music videos directed by Matt Lenski
Songs written by Ben Bridwell